Nine Perfect Strangers is a 2018 novel by Australian author Liane Moriarty. It was published on September 18, 2018 by Macmillan Australia. It is a New York Times Bestseller.

Synopsis

Nine people from different walks of life attend a pricey 10-day "Mind and Body Total Transformation Retreat" at a place called the Tranquillum House run by a mysterious Russian woman named Masha. Throughout the course of their retreat they realize that each of them are battling their own demons and all of them are subjects of an experiment.

Characters
Tranquillum House staff:

 Masha, the Russian woman who runs the Tranquillum House
 Yao and Delilah, her dedicated employees

The nine strangers:

 Frances, a romance novelist
 Tony, an ex-athlete
 Jessica, a plastic-surgery-obsessed lottery winner
 Ben, Jessica's car-obsessed husband
 Carmel, a single mother of four who was left by her husband for a younger woman
 Lars, a divorce attorney
 Heather and Napoleon, a married couple who lost a twin son
 Zoe, Heather and Napoleon's 20-year-old twin daughter

Reception
The book received mixed reviews. Patty Rhule of USA Today gave the book two out of four stars, and said that it "does not match up to her captivating previous books." Specifically, she criticized the book for spending too many pages on character development. In contrast, Lisa Scottoline of the New York Times said that all the characters are "fully realized, with compelling lives, relationships and motivations" and that the novel is "thought-provoking, but never pedantic" as it "raises fascinating questions about our relentless quest for self-improvement."

It was 2018 Goodreads Choice Awards Finalist: Best Fiction.

Television adaptation

In January 2020, it was announced that the novel would be adapted into a television series, which premiered on Hulu in 2021. The series was co-written by David E. Kelley, John-Henry Butterworth, and Samantha Strauss and starred Nicole Kidman as Masha and Melissa McCarthy as Frances. On 27 May 2020, Manny Jacinto was cast in the role of Yao. The cast also includes Luke Evans as Lars, Melvin Gregg as Ben, Samara Weaving as Jessica, Asher Keddie as Heather, Grace Van Patten as Zoe, Tiffany Boone as Delilah, Michael Shannon as Napoleon, Regina Hall as Carmel, Hal Cumpston as Zachary and Bobby Cannavale as Tony. The series was directed by Jonathan Levine. Filming began in August 2020, in Byron Bay, Australia.

References

2018 Australian novels
Australian mystery novels
Australian novels adapted into television shows